Inlander was a Canadian ship built in 1910.

Inlander may refer to:

 Native Indonesians (pribumi or bumiputera), known as Inlanders during colonial era of Dutch East Indies
 Mainland Chinese, sometimes called Inlanders

See also
The Inlander (disambiguation)